Andrei Molodkin (born 1966) is a Russian born conceptual artist living and working in Paris, France.

Biography
Molodkin was born in Buy, Kostroma Oblast, a small town in North-Western Russia. He served in the Soviet Army for two years from 1985 to 1987 transporting missiles across Siberia. He later graduated from the Architecture and Interior design department at the Stroganov Moscow State University of Arts and Industry in 1992.

Work and career
Molodkin's practise comprises drawing, sculpture and installation. His drawings are made in ball-point pen, an implement that references his experiences in the Soviet Military "where soldiers would receive two Bics a day to write letters", they are often "laboriously drawn replicas of mass-media images". His sculptures and installations often employ materials techniques and practices common in engineering "Molodkin creates a complex mechanical system consisting of air compressors, cast-iron pumps, and plastic tubing" that pump liquids (most commonly blood and/or crude oil) around hollowed perspex replicas of sculptures and architecture, as well as politically loaded words and phrases. According to Douglas Rogers, author of 'The Depths of Russia: Oil, Power and Culture After Socialism', "His [Molodkin] work draws attention to the technical systems that channel political and economic configurations and to the ways in which words, concepts and spaces can be colored, inflected, shaped and filled by their associations with oil."  

In 2009 Molodkin was invited to participate in the Russian Pavilion of the 53rd Venice Biennale, the exhibition was named 'Victory Over The Future'. For the Pavilion Molodkin submitted his 2009 work 'Le Rouge et le Noir', a multimedia installation that featured a two hollow acrylic block replicas of the statue of  Nike of Samothrace, a Hellenistic sculpture on permanent display at the Louvre depicting Nike, the Greek goddess of victory. The installation featured the blood of a Russian soldier and veteran of the Chechen War being mixed, using a system of pumps, with Chechen oil inside the cavities of the blocks. The piece was deemed too controversial leading to the pavilion's curator removing the description of the piece from display.

A 2013 exhibition by Molodkin in the Void Gallery in Derry entitled 'Catholic Blood'  was created specifically for the context of Derry and Northern Ireland. 'Catholic Blood' tapped into contentious historical divides in Ireland, as its subject is based in the Catholic Relief Act of 1829 and a particular clause of the British constitution that reportedly forbids any MP from advising the sovereign on ecclesiastical matters if they are of the Catholic faith, though this was disputed by Dr Bob Morris, an expert in constitutional affairs at University College London. Molodkin correctly asserted, "Yes, but there have been no Catholic prime ministers, perhaps when we talk about it we will get one." The work was controversial in its choice of materials which consisted of blood donated by local Catholics, a specification that was met with resistance. The project required the participation of the public, thirty-six people came forward to donate their blood, including the son of a Catholic Priest. The piece was constructed from hollowed acrylic blocks, mirroring the rose window of the Palace of Westminster. A pharmaceutical fridge contained samples of donated human blood and an industrial compressor pumped this blood through the cavity of the rose window in the acrylic block. This was simultaneously filmed and projected onto the gallery walls.

Molodkin, reflecting on the exhibition and the vociferous reaction, stated: "Some people were angry that I hadn't used both Catholic and Protestant blood. They felt cheated that I had only chosen to use Catholic blood. It was never my intention to mix religions - the intensity is in the separation.

He currently lives and works between the French capital, Paris, and Maubourguet in Southern France. His work is held in a number of significant public and private collections, including the Tate national collection.

Solo exhibitions

2014
Transformer No.M208, Ducal Palace, Genova.

2013
Immigrant Blood, Patricia Dorfmann Gallery, Paris.
Catholic Blood, Void Gallery, Derry.
Post-Utopian Simulacrum, Wooson Gallery, Daegu.
Crude, American University Museum, Washington, D.C.

2012
Liquid Black, Museum Villa Stuck, Munich.

2011
Crude, Station Museum of Contemporary Art, Houston.
Transformer No.V579, Art Sensus Gallery, London.
Sincere, Galleria Pack, Milan.
Crude, Art Sensus, London
2010
Absolute Return, Orel Art Gallery, Paris.

2009
Andrei Molodkin: Liquid Modernity (Grid and Greed), Orel Art Gallery, London.
Swiss Passion, Priska Pasquer Gallery, Cologne.
Oil Evolution, Daneyal Mahmood Gallery, New York.

2008
Guts à la Russe, Orel Art Gallery, Paris.

2007
Direct From The Pipe, ANNE+ Art Projects, Ivry sur Seine,France.
G8, Kashya Hildebrand Gallery, Zurich, Switzerland
Sweet Crude American Dream, Daneyal Mahmood Gallery, New York

2006
Cold War II, Orel Art Gallery, Paris
Empire at War, Daneyal Mahmood Gallery, New York
Sweet Crude Eternity, Kashya Hildebrand Gallery, Zurich, Switzerland

2005
Sweet crude Eternity, Kashya Hildebrand Gallery, New York

2004
Notre Patrimoine, European Parliament, Brussels
Trash resources, Kashya Hildebrand Gallery, New York

2003
Love Copyright, Orel Art Presenta Gallery, Paris
Love Copyright, Kashya Hildebrand Gallery, New York

2002
Polius, Chapelle Saint-Louis de la Salpêtrière, Orel Art Presenta Gallery, Paris
Carré Noir Gallery, Paris

2001
Novo Novosibirsk, The Marble Palace, Russian State Museum, St. Petersburg
Blue Dream, Freud's Dream Museum, St. Petersburg

1999
Novo Novosibirsk, Chapelle Saint-Louis de la Salpêtrière, Paris

Literature
Andrei Molodkin: Post-Utopian Simulacrum, eds. Wooson Gallery, Daegu, 2013.
Andrei Molodkin: Crude, eds. Silvana Editoriale, The Station Museum, Houston, 2013.
Andrei Molodkin: Absolute Return, eds. Silvana Editoriale, Musée d'Art Moderne de Saint-Etienne Métropole, France, 2011.
Andrei Molodkin: Holy Oil, 2010.
Andrei Molodkin: Liquid Modernity, 2009.
Andrei Molodkin: Cold War II, eds. Victor Tupitsyn and Margarita Tupitsyn, Kashya Hildebrand Gallery, Zurich, 2007.

References

External links
 Andrei-Molodkin on re-title.com
 Interview with Molodkin in The Times
 BBC feature on Molodkin

20th-century Russian painters
Russian male painters
21st-century Russian painters
Living people
1966 births
20th-century Russian male artists
21st-century Russian male artists
Stroganov Moscow State Academy of Arts and Industry alumni